Nelson Water Aerodrome  is located adjacent to Nelson, British Columbia, Canada.

See also
Nelson Airport (British Columbia)

References

Seaplane bases in British Columbia
Registered aerodromes in British Columbia
Nelson, British Columbia